The Democratic Tamil National Alliance (abbreviated DTNA), previously known as the Tamil Democratic National Alliance (abbreviated TDNA), is a political alliance in Sri Lanka that represents the country's Sri Lankan Tamil ethnic minority. The alliance is recognised by the Election Commission of Sri Lanka as registered political party with the brass lamp (kuthuvilakku) as its symbol.

History
The Tamil Democratic National Alliance (TDNA) was formed in 2008 by the Democratic People's Liberation Front (DPLF), the Eelam People's Revolutionary Liberation Front (Pathmanabha wing) and the Tamil United Liberation Front to contest the 2008 Sri Lanka Eastern Provincial Council election. The TDNA secured 1.30% of the votes in the election, winning a single seat, R. Thurairatnam in Batticaloa District.

Following the end of the Sri Lankan Civil War in 2009 the Sri Lankan Tamil diaspora started exerting pressure on Sri Lankan Tamil political parties to unite and so DPLF/PLOTE and the  TULF joined the Tamil National Alliance (TNA), the largest political group representing Sri Lankan Tamils. The EPRLF (Pathmanabha wing) led by T. Sritharan alias Sugu was not allowed to join the TNA due to the opposition of TNA member EPRLF (Suresh wing) led by Suresh Premachandran. The TDNA remained dormant thereafter.

In December 2022 the Illankai Tamil Arasu Kachchi, the main constituent of the TNA, announced that it would contest the 2023 Sri Lankan local elections on its own. In response, the two remaining members of the TNA, DPLF/PLOTE and the Tamil Eelam Liberation Organization, resurrected the TDNA, which was now known as the Democratic Tamil National Alliance (DTNA), in January 2023 to contest the election. The alliance was joined by the Crusaders for Democracy, EPRLF (Suresh) and the Tamil National Party. The DTNA is downplaying the "Democratic" in its name to imply that it's the TNA.

Members

Current

Former

Election results

Provincial

Notes

References

2008 establishments in Sri Lanka
Political parties established in 2008
Political party alliances in Sri Lanka
Sri Lankan Tamil nationalist parties